Khadzhykulluk is a town in eastern Turkmenistan. It is located in Lebap Province.

Nearby towns and villages include Sardoba (9.2 nm), Batash (6.7 nm), Tollimarjon (15.3 nm), Akaltyn (32.0 nm), Kokmiyar (21.7 nm), Qizilcha (28.5 nm), Dzhity-Kuduk(8.7 nm) and 
Kazarma (20.1 nm) .

See also 
List of cities, towns and villages in Turkmenistan

References

External links
Satellite map at Maplandia.com

Populated places in Lebap Region